John E. Parry House is a historic home located at Glens Falls, Warren County, New York. It was built about 1890 and is a rectangular -story frame residence that incorporates transitional Queen Anne / Colonial Revival–style design elements. The house incorporates stone, clapboards, and shingles in its exterior. It features a broad, bracketed porch with pediment. The architect was Ephraim Potter.

It was added to the National Register of Historic Places in 1984.

References

Houses on the National Register of Historic Places in New York (state)
Queen Anne architecture in New York (state)
Colonial Revival architecture in New York (state)
Houses completed in 1890
Houses in Warren County, New York
National Register of Historic Places in Warren County, New York